The Lower Saxony National Party (Niedersächsische Landespartei) was a short lived regionalist political party in Germany.

It was founded in 1945 as a recreation of the regionalist German-Hanoverian Party that had been active in the period between the creation of the German Empire and the rise of the Nazi Party.  It called for the establishment of a Lower Saxon state within a federal Germany and sought to represent Christian conservatism.

In 1947 after Lower Saxony had been created the party resurrected its old name of the German Party (Deutsche Partei, DP).

References

Defunct regional parties in Germany
Political parties established in 1945
Political parties disestablished in 1947
20th century in Lower Saxony
1945 establishments in Germany
Protestant political parties
Conservative parties in Germany